Sékou Tidiane Souaré (born April 9, 1983 in Abidjan) is an Ivorian footballer, who last played for Al-Shorta SC as a defensive midfielder or central defender.

Career
He was signed by Ferencvarosi TC from Chengdu Blades in 2008 alongside fellow Ivorians Bamba Moussa, Kourouma Mohamed Lamine and Dramane Kamate. Souare was bought by Sheffield United F.C in January transfer of 2007 and he was loaned to Chengdu Blades F.C. Due to work permit problem in the United Kingdom, in the 2008-09 season, he was again loaned out to Ferencvarosi TC and returned in the summer of 2009, but a year after he joined Maltese side Sliema Wanderers as a free player. In November 2011, Souare signed with Faroese champions B36 Tórshavn.

References

Ivorian footballers
1983 births
Living people
Expatriate footballers in Hungary
Sheffield United F.C. players
Ivorian expatriate sportspeople in Hungary
Footballers from Abidjan
Expatriate footballers in China
ASEC Mimosas players
Al-Shorta SC players
Expatriate footballers in England
Ivorian expatriate sportspeople in England
Ivorian expatriate sportspeople in China
Sabé Sports players
Expatriate footballers in Guinea
Ivorian expatriate sportspeople in Guinea
JC d'Abidjan players
Nemzeti Bajnokság I players
Ferencvárosi TC footballers
Association football midfielders
Association football central defenders